The Secret Diary of Adrian Mole Aged 13¾ is a stage musical based on the young-adult novel of the same name by Sue Townsend. It features book and lyrics by Jake Brunger and music and lyrics by Pippa Cleary.

The musical made its world première at the Curve in Leicester in March 2015, followed by a London production at the Menier Chocolate Factory in summer 2017 and a West End run at the Ambassadors Theatre from June to September 2019.

Productions

Leicester (2015) 
The musical was announced to make its world première at the Curve in Leicester (the title character and author Sue Townsend's hometown) from 7 March to 4 April 2015, with an official opening on 17 March.

The production was directed by Luke Sheppard, designed by Tom Rogers, choreographed by Tim Jackson. It was revealed upon the announcement by Townsend's husband, Colin Broadway, that Townsend had been working with the writers, Brunger and Cleary on the musical from 2012 to before her death in 2014.

Off-West End (2017) 
The musical made its London debut in a new production at the Menier Chocolate Factory in Southwark from 14 July to 6 September 2017, with an official opening on 26 July.

The new production was again directed by Luke Sheppard and designed by Tom Rogers with new choreography by Rebecca Howell. The new production was presented by the Menier Chocolate Factory and Curve in association with Anthony Clare and David Ian Productions.

The cast from this production recorded the Original London Cast Recording which will be released on 28 June 2019 to coincide with the West End production.

West End (2019) 
The Chocolate Factory production opened at the Ambassadors Theatre in the West End on 15 June 2019, playing a limited season, featuring a new cast (with the exceptions of Rosemary Ashe returning as Grandma from the Curve production and John Hopkins as Mr Lucas / Mr Scruton and Lara Denning as Miss Elf / Doreen Slater returning from the Menier Chocolate Factory production). The production was due to finish on 12 October 2019, however it was announced that it was due to close two weeks earlier than planned on 28 September 2019.

Cast and characters 

NB: The role of Mrs Lucas was cut for the London production.

Critical Reception

Leicester 
The world premiere at Leicester's Curve Theatre Theatre received 4 stars from The Daily Telegraph, The Times and The Guardian. Lyn Gardner in The Guardian wrote that Mole was "a home-grown hit for the Curve... a show constantly paying neat homage to previous British musicals and the traditions of the TV sitcom, and yet always staying distinctive and true to its source material... a quaint, unassuming little charmer". Dominic Cavendish in The Telegraph wrote that "this all-singing, all-dancing Mole comes up trumps; in fact, it's so good it could burrow its way to the West End... the evening does that rare thing: it makes you laugh, tugs at your heart-strings and honours the spirit of the original while being playfully inventive... this fresh, funny, stirring spin on a Thatcher-era classic may be around for a long time to come." Dominic Maxwell in The Times wrote 'it's no small achievement to make this first musical version such a lively, evocative pleasure... amusing and affecting enough to leave you glowing... a thoroughly charming evening: faithful to the book but with a tenderness of its own.'

London 
The 2017 London production at the Menier Chocolate Factory received 5 stars from The Evening Standard, The Independent and Whatsonstage.com, with 4 star reviews from The Daily Telegraph, The Times and The Guardian. Michael Billington in The Guardian described it as "A fresh and funny show from the young songwriting team of Jake Brunger (book and lyrics) and Pippa Cleary (music and lyrics). They clearly have the potential to inject new life into the anaemic British musical" with Fiona Mountford in The Evening Standard calling it 'a perfectly realised new British musical'. Ben Brantley also positively reviewed the musical in The New York Times, describing it as "a delightful new musical".

References 

2015 musicals
Musicals based on novels
Adrian Mole
British musicals
Plays set in England